Frank Schneider is a former spy who was active for the Luxembourg intelligence.

Biography 
Schneider has been the operational director of the Service de Renseignement de l'État (SREL), the intelligence agency of Luxembourg.

Sandstone 
He founded the private investigation firm Sandstone in 2015. Sandstone was hired by OneCoin. In April 2021 he was brutally arrested by the French police, going as far as holding his 14 year old son at gun point related to a fraud case in the US. His extradiction was postponed until September. He faces 5 years in prison in Luxembourg.

Sandstone has denied press reports that they were preparing a report stating that Daphne Caruana Galizia was assassinated by Russians.

References 

Year of birth missing (living people)
Living people

Luxembourgish spies